The 1989–90 Rugby League Divisional Premiership  was the 4th end-of-season Rugby League Divisional Premiership competition.

The competition was contested by the top eight teams in the second Division. The winners were Oldham.

First round

Semi-finals

Final

See also
 1989–90 Rugby Football League season

Notes

References
 

Rugby League Divisional Premiership